Hah or HAH may refer to:

 Laughter
 Air Comores International, a defunct airline
 Hah (Korean surname)
 Hahon language
 Hang Hau station, in Hong Kong
 Heaven and Hell (Black Sabbath album), released in 1980
 Him & Her (TV series)
 Heh (god), a figure in Egyptian mythology
 HAH, the IATA code for Prince Said Ibrahim International Airport in Moroni, Comoros

See also
 Ha (disambiguation)
 Heh (disambiguation)
 Huh (disambiguation)